Gerardo Antonio Escaroz Soler (born 12 August 1957) is a Mexican politician from the National Action Party. From 2006 to 2009 he served as Deputy of the LX Legislature of the Mexican Congress representing Yucatán.

References

1957 births
Living people
Politicians from Yucatán (state)
People from Mérida, Yucatán
National Action Party (Mexico) politicians
21st-century Mexican politicians
Universidad Autónoma de Yucatán alumni
Deputies of the LX Legislature of Mexico
Members of the Chamber of Deputies (Mexico) for Yucatán